Mohd Fared bin Mohd Khalid is a Malaysian politician and currently serves as Johor State Executive Councillor.

Election results

References 

Living people
People from Batu Pahat
People from Johor
Malaysian people of Malay descent
Malaysian Muslims
United Malays National Organisation politicians
21st-century Malaysian politicians
Members of the Johor State Legislative Assembly
Year of birth missing (living people)